Barbara Marty Kälin (28 March 1954 – 27 November 2022) was a Swiss politician. A member of the Social Democratic Party, she served in the National Council from 2000 to 2007.

Kälin died on 27 November 2022, at the age of 68.

References

1954 births
2022 deaths
20th-century Swiss politicians
20th-century Swiss women politicians
21st-century Swiss politicians
21st-century Swiss women politicians
Social Democratic Party of Switzerland politicians
Members of the National Council (Switzerland)
Women members of the National Council (Switzerland)
People from Schaffhausen